Iryna Pissareva (born 4 May 1974) is a Ukrainian diver. She competed in the women's 3 metre springboard event at the 1996 Summer Olympics.

References

1974 births
Living people
Ukrainian female divers
Olympic divers of Ukraine
Divers at the 1996 Summer Olympics
Place of birth missing (living people)